Michael Fullilove , a public and international policy academic, is the Executive Director of the Lowy Institute for International Policy, an international policy think tank located in Sydney, New South Wales, Australia.

Fullilove is the author of Rendezvous with Destiny: How Franklin D. Roosevelt and Five Extraordinary Men Took America into the War and into the World (2013), which won the 2014 New South Wales Premier's Literary Award for Non-Fiction. He is also the editor of a 2014 revised edition of Men and Women of Australia! Our Greatest Modern Speeches.

Fullilove writes widely on global issues and Australian foreign policy. His work has appeared in numerous publications and newspapers including The Australian, The Australian Financial Review, The Financial Times, Foreign Affairs, Foreign Policy, The National Interest, The New York Times, Slate, The Sydney Morning Herald, The Wall Street Journal, and The Washington Post.

He also regularly appears as a guest on Australian and international television and radio, and in the past has appeared on programs such as Charlie Rose, ABC Radio National's RN Breakfast and the ABC television's Lateline. In 2015, he delivered the ABC Boyer Lectures.

Education

Fullilove's high school education was at North Sydney Boys' High School in Crows Nest, Sydney. He undertook undergraduate studies at the University of Sydney and the University of New South Wales, where he received degrees in arts and law and was awarded dual university medals. He studied as a Rhodes Scholar at the University of Oxford, where he took a master's degree and a doctorate in international relations.

Career
Fullilove is currently the executive director of the Lowy Institute for International Policy. He wrote the feasibility study for the Lowy Institute in 2002, and served as the director of its global issues program for almost a decade. He was then appointed to the executive director position in August 2012. He has also worked as a visiting fellow at the Brookings Institution in Washington, D.C., an adviser to Australian Prime Minister Paul Keating, and a lawyer. Fullilove remains a nonresident senior fellow at Brookings.

In 2005, Fullilove published 'Men and Women of Australia!' Our Greatest Modern Speeches, an edited collection of post-Federation speeches delivered either by Australians or by notable visitors to Australia. A revised second edition of this collection was published in 2014. In 2013 he co-edited, with Lowy Institute Research Director Anthony Bubalo, Reports from a Turbulent Decade, an anthology of Lowy Institute's work from 2003 to 2013. Also in 2013, Fullilove published his Rendezvous with Destiny: How Franklin D. Roosevelt and Five Extraordinary Men Took America into the War and into the World,  which documents the role played by five of Franklin D. Roosevelt's 'personal envoys' in drawing the United States into the Second World War. On 19 May 2014 Rendezvous with Destiny was awarded the New South Wales Premier's Literary Award for Non-Fiction.

Books 
 "A Larger Australia: The ABC 2015 Boyer Lectures." Penguin, 2015.
 Rendezvous with Destiny: How Franklin D. Roosevelt and Five Extraordinary Men Took America into the War and into the World. Penguin, 2013.
 (Editor) ‘Men and Women of Australia!’ Our Greatest Modern Speeches. Penguin, 2014.
 (Editor, with Anthony Bubalo) Reports from a Turbulent Decade: The Lowy Institute for International Policy 10th Anniversary Collection. Viking, 2013.

References

External links
Personal website

Living people
Australian historians
Australian political scientists
Australian Rhodes Scholars
University of New South Wales alumni
University of Sydney alumni
University of New South Wales Law School alumni
People educated at North Sydney Boys High School
Center on International Cooperation
Members of the Order of Australia
Year of birth missing (living people)
Brookings Institution people